Bahram Nouraei (Persian: بهرام نورائی  ) also professionally known as Bahram (Persian: بهرام) is a hip hop recording artist and record producer from Tehran, Iran currently living in Stockholm, Sweden. He is one of the premier hip hop artists in Iranian underground music and Hip Hop and Rap music in Iran  movement and considered to be one of the 50 most influential people in the culture of the Middle East.

Music career 
Bahram Nouraei's first breakthrough hit was a political single track called "Nameyee Be Rayees Jomhour" (in English: A letter to the president) in 2007 which was written in the form of an open letter criticizing the sixth president of Iran Mahmoud Ahmadinejad. His debut album "24 Sa'at" (In Persian: 24 ساعت) (In English: 24 Hours) released in August 2008 containing the track "Inja Irane" (In Persian: اینجا ایرانه) (In English: Here's Iran) which is described as a powerful commentary on modern-day of Iran by Rolling Stone.
His second studio album "Sokoot" (In Persian: سکوت) (In English: Silence) released in 2011 containing the first Iranian abstract hip hop track called "Khorshid Khanoom" (In Persian: خورشید خانم) (In English: Lady Sunshine) written in the form of a monologue with the sun in a chronological order.

Good Mistake 
Bahram's third LP album "Eshtebahe Khoob" (In Persian: اشتباه خوب) (In English: Good Mistake) is the first Iranian concept album ever made using reverse chronology as the storytelling method. The album has been commonly produced by Bahram Nouraei and Mahdyar Aghajani and sponsored by Cultures of Resistance Network Foundation. Good Mistake is independently released on 4th of July 2015 and ranked #4 and #6 on Billboard's Top World Albums Chart for the last two weeks of July 2015. The project is also followed by a collection of artworks designed exclusively for each and every track in order to provide visual interpretations for the album.

Gozaar 
Bahram's EP album called "Gozaar" (In Persian: گذار) (In English: Transition) was released at the same time as the Iranian New Year (on March 22, 2020). Produced by Nesa Azadikhah, Ashkan Mousavi and Peymandegar.

Activism 
In 2009 Bahram spent one week in Evin prison which houses political prisoners. Bahram was accused for illegal cultural activism but luckily set free. He has also appeared in a documentary film called "Bahram: An Iranian Rapper" intended to present the underground music scene in Iran and explain the Iranian culture after the Islamic revolution. The film was presented in an independent film festival called San Francisco's Iranian film festival at the San Francisco Art Institute (SFAI) in September 2011.

Discography

Albums 

 24 Sa'at | 24 Hours (Aug 2008)
01. "24 Sa'at"
02. "Man"
03. "Khiyaboon"
04. "Rahe Man"
05. "Inja Irane"
06. "Gele Nakon"
07. "Delnevesht"
08. "Bikhialesh"
09. "Afsoos"

 Sokoot | Silence (May 2011)
01. "Intro"
02. "Jalebe"
03. "Harfaye Man"
04. "Az Man Bepors"
05. "Mano Bebakhsh"
06. "Dar Naro"
07. "Yeki Tomast Yeki Gorg"
08. "Nasle Man"
09. "Be Chi Eteghad Dari"
10. "Khorshid Khanoom"
11. "Ye Hes"
12. "Yaghi"
13. "Ajib"
14. "Outro"

 Eshtebahe Khoob | Good Mistake (July 2015)
01. "Khoob"
02. "Saz"
03. "Lams"
04. "Naghsh"
05. "Negah"
06. "Jang"
07. "Tekrar"
08. "Niaz"
09. "Zakhm"
10. "Rishe"
11. "Momken"
12. "Mordab"
13. "Sooz"
14. "Boresh"
15. "Solh"
16. "Eshtebah"

 Gozaar | Transition (March 2020)
01. "Ghahghara"
02. "Charkheh"
03. "Omgh"
04. "Moghabeleh"
05. "Adam"

Single Tracks 

 Nameyee Be Rayees Jomhoor (2007)
 Ma Ba Hamim (Feat. Reza Pishro) (2007)
 Paye Kaar (Feat. Nimosh) (2007)
 Marge Rap e Fars (Feat. Tighe & Suchme) (2007)
 Ino Befahm (Feat. Erfan) (2010)
 Goosht (Prod. Peymandegar) (2019)
 oboor kon 
 Beshno (In Persian: بشنو) (In English: Listen) (Prod. Peymandegar) (2021)

References

External links
 Website
 Instagram
 Spotify
 SoundCloud
 Twitter
 YouTube
 YouTube Music
 Apple Music
 Deezer
 Facebook
 iHeartRadio
 Mideastunes
 Google Play Music
 Tidal

1988 births
Living people
Iranian rappers
People from Tehran
Iranian songwriters
Singers from Tehran
Iranian male singers
Persian-language singers
Iranian hip hop musicians
Iranian emigrants to Sweden
Iranian expatriates in Sweden
21st-century Iranian male singers